Stumptown Kid is a children's novel by Carol Gorman and Ron J. Findley, first published in 2005 by Peachtree.

Synopsis 

In a small Iowa town in 1952, eleven-year-old Charlie Nebraska, whose father died in the Korean War, learns the meanings of both racism and heroism when he befriends a black man who had played baseball in the Negro leagues.

Main characters 

Charlie Nebraska: An eleven-year-old boy whose dad died in the Korean war. He likes to play baseball but doesn't make the community team, the Wildcats.

Will Draft: Charlie's best friend. Will plays baseball for the Wildcats.

Brad Lobo: Also plays for the Wildcats. He is a bully and hates Charlie.

Luther Peale: Charlie's friend and dad. Former player in the Negro leagues but hurt his arm after pitching the ball that killed Ruckus Brody's Brother.

Reception 
John Peters, for The Booklist called the book "competent, if unexceptional", remarking all characters fall nicely on good and bad stereotypes, which might be attractive for young readers.

In her review, Sharron McElmeel gives high praise for how Stumptown Kid authors tackled the subject of racism in a small community, as well as for having elements of action and mystery. McElmeel also says that the book "brings many opportunities to stimulate readers' curiosity and engage the reader in history." The presence of "[t]hemes of honesty, loyalty, and heroism" were also pointed out by Gerry Larson in his review for the School Library Journal. Larson also calls the story "powerful" and "fastpaced", concluding by saying: "Readers will enjoy this winning mix of sports, suspense, and heroism".

Awards and accolades 

 Nominations
 Keystone State Reading Association (Pennsylvania) Young Adult Book Award 2006
 Great Stone Face Children's Book Award (New Hampshire 2006-07)
 Emphasis on Reading Program 2006-2007 Booklist
 2008-09 Sunshine State Young Readers Award Master List (grades 3-5)
 2008 Sasquatch Award
 South Carolina Children's Book Award
 2008 Louisiana Young Readers' Choice list
 2007-2008 Iowa Teen Award
 2010 Nutmeg Book Award

 Winner
 2005-2006 Pennsylvania Young Adult Top Forty List
 Kansas State Reading Circle 2005 Recommended Reading List. Listed in the Kansas National Education Association "Reading Circle Catalog.

References

External links 
 Stumptown Kid on Peachtree

2005 American novels
American children's novels
Baseball novels
Novels set in Iowa
Fiction set in 1952
Racism in fiction
2005 children's books